= Sports Boyfriend =

- Born: Eileen Peltier; Connecticut
- Genres: Indie rock
- Website: sportsboyfriend.bandcamp.com

Sports Boyfriend is the stage name of indie rock musician Eileen Peltier currently based Chicago, Illinois.

== History ==
Peltier was born and raised in Connecticut. Peltier moved to Chicago for college, attending DePaul University and graduating in 2016. Peltier studied economics and art history. The name Sports Boyfriend came from Peltier's sister making fun of her for wearing a varsity jacket in high school, referring to it as a "sports boyfriend jacket". Peltier released her first song "Pop Psychology" on SoundCloud in 2015. The track became part of Peltier's first EP of the same name. In 2018, Peltier was named one of "The 15 Chicago Bands You Need to Know in 2018". In 2019, Peltier released a song titled "Crying in July" from her second EP titled Seek No Answer. Peltier released her debut album under the Sports Boyfriend moniker on June 8, 2026.

== Discography ==
Studio albums

- Slice of Life (2026)

EPs

- Pop Psychology (2015)
- Seek No Answer (2020)
